Jack Creek is an unincorporated community in Elko County, Nevada, United States. 
It took its name from nearby Jack Creek.

The Jack Creek area became the prime source of wood for Tuscarora. Jack Creek soon became a stop on the Northern Stage Company's line from Tuscarora to Mountain City. It was created a little community of about 20 inhabitants and few other ranches had formed in the region. A local rancher  Chesley Woodward operated in the city a store, a restaurant, a rooming house for many years. Population has increased and an Opera House was built there, but it was very small, but people of the little community liked of the leisure and camaraderie. Harrington died in 1886 and his properties were acquired by several owners and the area was developed for travelers and fishing parties and hunters and became a local sportsmen's mecca. The resort was closed, but there is the hope of its reopen in the future.

References

Unincorporated communities in Nevada
Unincorporated communities in Elko County, Nevada
Populated places established in the 1860s